The Wych Elm cultivar Ulmus glabra 'Maculata' was listed as Ulmus scabra maculata in the 1831-1832 catalogue from the  Audibert brothers' nursery at Tonelle, near Tarascon in France.

Description
Audibert described the tree as having spotted leaves.

Cultivation
No specimens are known to survive.

References

External links
"Herbarium specimen BR0000010840443". Botanic Garden, Meise. Sheet labelled U. campestris L. Maculatis, but probably variegated English Elm

Wych elm cultivar
Ulmus articles missing images
Ulmus
Missing elm cultivars